Ernest George Canning (11 August 1902 – 16 November 1995) was an English first-class cricketer active 1929–31 who played for Middlesex. He was born in Marylebone; died in Southampton.

References

1902 births
1995 deaths
English cricketers
Middlesex cricketers
Marylebone Cricket Club cricketers
Hertfordshire cricketers